Kazhugu is a 2012 Indian Tamil-language comedy thriller film written and directed by newcomer Sathyasiva, starring Krishna and Bindu Madhavi. The film, produced by Krishna's father K. K. Sekhar along with K. S. Madhubala, features music composed by Yuvan Shankar Raja. The story revolves around four persons, referred to as "Kazhugu", who recover bodies of suicide victims who jump off a cliff. The film, based on real-life incidents, has been shot in real locations, including Kodaikanal, Theni and Munnar. It had been in making since late 2010 and eventually released on 16 March 2012, to mixed reviews and became a sleeper hit.

Plot
Sera (Krishna) is a man who earns his living by retrieving dead bodies from Kodaikanal's Green Valley View suicide point. Nandu (Karunas), Shanmugam (Thambi Ramaiah), and a mute friend are part of Sera's crew. Sera meets Kavitha (Bindu Madhavi) when he and his crew retrieve her sister's body from a gully after her sister had committed suicide with her boyfriend. Kavitha falls in love with Sera. A parallel plot is of Ayya (Jayaprakash), who trades in stolen tea, with corrupt officials turning a blind eye to his activities. Ayya's gang kills four police officers during a raid and throws the dead bodies from the suicide point. Ayya, who knows Shanmugam, threatens him not to retrieve the bodies of the police officers. Fearing for their lives, Shanmugam tries to convince Sera not to retrieve the bodies. Brushing aside Shanmugam's fears, Sera's crew retrieves the bodies. After retrieving the bodies, Sera informs the police of the murder by Ayya, resulting in Ayya's arrest. Ayya comes out in bail, and his men kill Shanmugam, Nandu, and Sera's mute friend. Sera kills Ayya's henchmen. Kavitha consoles Sera, and they both decide to run away from Kodaikanal to lead a peaceful life. They both board a jeep, and on the way, Ayya arrives with his men, and they start attacking Sera. Sera kills most of them and also Ayya. He rushes back to the jeep but is shocked to see Kavitha dead. Sera understands that Kavitha was accidentally stabbed to death during the fight. Sera cries loud, jumps from the mountain, and kills himself along with Kavitha's dead body.

Cast
 Krishna as Sera
 Bindu Madhavi as Kavitha
 Karunas as Nandu
 Thambi Ramaiah as Shanmugam (Chittappa @ Chithu)
 Jayaprakash as Ayya
 Praveen G. Vadivelu
 Nellai Siva as Police Officer
 Sujibala as Valli
 Nitish Veera as Ayya's henchman
 Halwa Vasu as Drunkard

Special appearances in promotional song by (in alphabetical order):

Aarthi
Arya
Divyadarshini
Ganeshkar
Jennifer
Jiiva
Kala
Keerthi
Linguswamy
Oviya
Pandiraj
Perarasu
Premji Amaren
Priya Anand
Pushpavanam Kuppusamy
Raadhika
S. J. Surya
Sanjeev
Sivakarthikeyan
Thaman
Venkat Prabhu
Vijayalakshmi
Vishnuvardhan

Soundtrack

The soundtrack of Kazhugu was composed by Yuvan Shankar Raja. It features five tracks, which were sung by Yuvan Shankar Raja himself, his brother Karthik Raja and noted folk music artists Pushpavanam Kuppusamy and Velmurugan among others. Yuvan Shankar Raja said that he composed two of the songs keeping the visuals in mind, after he had seen the video montages that were shot. The lyrics were penned by Na. Muthukumar, Snehan and Eaknath. The soundtrack album was released on 23 November 2011 at Sathyam Cinemas. In early March 2012, the video of the song "Aambalaikum Pombalaikum" was released as a promo track featuring several film personalities from Tamil cinema (see cast).

Release
The satellite rights of the film were sold to Sun TV. The film was given a "U/A" certificate by the Indian Censor Board.

Reception

Critical response
The film, upon release, fetched mixed reviews. A reviewer from Sify.com said Kazhugu was a "realistic romantic thriller that seldom loses its grip on your attention. Credible performances from its leads, a nail-biting screenplay along with a fresh milieu makes it an engaging film". The Times of India gave it 3.5 out of 5, claiming that it was "gripping from start to finish". Indiaglitz.com noted that it was a "bright film with a dark theme". Rohit Ramachandran of Nowrunning.com rated Kazhugu 1/5 calling it vile. Malathi Rangarajam from The Hindu wrote: "It's heartening to see young filmmakers daring to steer clear of stereotypes. S. Sathyasiva who makes his bow with Kazhugu is the latest in this category". The critic further cited that director Sathyasiva was "a director to watch out for". Kannan Vijayakumar of Moviecrow rated it 3 out of 5, and labelled it "Above Average" stating "Kazhugu is well-researched unique attempt with interesting backdrop, but failed to fully utilize its potential due to shaky screenplay".

Pavithra Srinivasan from Rediff.com gave the film 2.5 out of 5 and commenting: Kazhugu starts off well but the extreme predictability of the screenplay makes sure that tedium sets in, leading to a rather tame climax". Behindwoods.com gave it 2 out of 5 and said that the backdrop of the film was "genuinely interesting", while criticizing that the script should have been "more inclusive so that the possibilities of the theme can be fully exploited rather than ending up as an averagely executed revenge action film".

References

External links
 

Indian comedy thriller films
2000s comedy thriller films
2012 films
2010s Tamil-language films
Films shot in Kodaikanal
Films shot in Ooty
Films shot in Munnar
Indian films based on actual events
Films scored by Yuvan Shankar Raja
2012 directorial debut films
Films directed by Sathyasiva